The Silver Chalice is a 1954 American historical epic drama film directed and produced by Victor Saville, based on Thomas B. Costain's 1952 novel of the same name. It was one of Saville's last films and marked the feature film debut of Paul Newman; despite being nominated for a Golden Globe Award for his performance, Newman later called it "the worst motion picture produced during the 1950s".

Plot
A Greek artisan from Antioch is commissioned to cast the cup of Christ in silver and sculpt around its rim the faces of the disciples and Jesus himself. He travels to Jerusalem and eventually to Rome to complete the task. Meanwhile, a nefarious interloper is trying to convince the crowds that he is the new Messiah by using nothing more than cheap parlor tricks.

Cast
It marked the film début of Paul Newman as an artist named Basil (né Ambrose), who was given the task of making a silver chalice to house the Holy Grail. It also featured Virginia Mayo as Helena, Pier Angeli as Deborra, Jack Palance as Simon Magus, Joseph Wiseman as Mijamin, Alexander Scourby as Saint Luke, Walter Hampden as Joseph of Arimathea, Lorne Greene as Peter, and a brief appearance by Natalie Wood, who plays Helena as a young woman. It was also the feature film débuts of Greene and Robert Middleton.

Cast as Listed in the Opening Credits:

 Virginia Mayo as Helena
 Pier Angeli as Deborra
 Jack Palance as Simon
 Paul Newman as Basil
 Walter Hampden as Joseph of Arimathea
 Joseph Wiseman as Mijamin
 Alexander Scourby as Luke
 Lorne Greene as Peter
 David J. Stewart as Adam
 Herbert Rudley as Linus
 Jacques Aubuchon as Nero
 E. G. Marshall as Ignatius
 Michael Pate as Aaron
 Natalie Wood as a young Helena
 Booth Colman as Hiram
 Terence De Marney as Sosthene
 Robert Middleton as Idbash
 Ian Wolfe as Theron
 Lawrence Dobkin as Ephraim
 Philip Tonge as Ohad
 Albert Dekker as Kester
 Strother Martin as Father

Style

The film featured unusual semiabstract settings and decor, created by the stage designer Rolfe Gerard in a striking departure from the normal practice of the day for Hollywood biblical "epics". A notable musical score by Franz Waxman was nominated for an Academy Award.

Release

Premiere
The film had its world premiere in the small town of Saranac Lake, New York, which won a competition selling Christmas Seals. Saville, Mayo, Angeli and Palance attended and participated in a parade around the time of the town's annual winter carnival. The premiere was hosted by television personality Art Linkletter.

Home media
The film was released on DVD in 2009.

Reception

Critical reception
A. H. Weiler of The New York Times wrote that the filmmakers "have come up with a spectacle-filled adventure easily fitted to the lush hues of WarnerColor and the king-sized screen of Cinemascope. But in providing a modicum of excitement and generous portions of extravaganza they have turned out a cumbersome and sometimes creaking vehicle that takes too long to reach its goal."

Variety wrote "Like the Costain book, the picture is overdrawn and sometimes tedious, but producer-director Victor Saville still manages to instill interest in what's going on, and even hits a feeling of excitement occasionally. John L. Scott of the Los Angeles Times wrote that "it is colorful at times, rather tedious in other portions." Richard L. Coe of The Washington Post wrote "Lester Samuels' screen play meanders self-consciously and Victor Saville's direction is just as overblown. I found nothing remarkable in the performances of the leads, Paul Newman (not as good as he's been on TV), Pier Angeli, Virginia Mayo (more synthetically blondined than ever), Jack Palance (an overtheatric villain), or even Walter Hampden (the ancient Joseph)." Harrison's Reports thought the film "deserves a high rating from the production point of view," but was "only moderately interesting" as entertainment. John McCarten of The New Yorker wrote that the film "has to do with the pursuit of the Grail by the most dismal assortment of characters I've encountered in a decade." The Monthly Film Bulletin wrote "Any true religious atmosphere in this vulgar and incongruous fancy-dress parade is out of the question...Some may discover uproarious moments, many will be repelled by the tastelessness of the spectacle as a whole."

Writing in the first edition of his Film Guide in 1977, Leslie Halliwell described the film as "[p]o-faced biblical hokum...with howlingly bad casting and direction...[a] sea of boredom", assigning it 0 stars out of 4.

The elaborate musical score by Franz Waxman has been prized more than the nearly forgotten movie. Elmer Bernstein recorded a suite in 1975, and Film Score Monthly released the surviving portions of the soundtrack recording in 2007.

Legacy
Martin Scorsese wrote about the film as a guilty pleasure in 1978:
The Silver Chalice is one of the reasons I hired Boris Leven to design New York, New York. Giant and The Silver Chalice: any man who could design those two films...that's it, I had to have him. The Silver Chalice, which is a bad picture, has no authenticity. It's purely theatrical, and this is mainly due to the sets. They're clean and clear; it's almost like another life, another world. We don't know what ancient Rome was like, so why not take the attitude Fellini had with Satyricon: make it science fiction in reverse? The Silver Chalice came close to that, fifteen years earlier.Paul Newman was apparently not proud of his performance. When the film was broadcast on television in 1966, he took out an advertisement in a Hollywood trade paper apologizing for his performance, and requesting people not to watch the film. This backfired, and the broadcast received unusually high ratings. The film is sometimes referred to as Paul Newman and the Holy Grail.  Newman called the film "the worst motion picture produced during the 1950s", and once screened it for guests at his home, handing out pots, wooden spoons, and whistles and encouraging the audience to offer noisy critiques.

References

External links

 
 
 
 
 

1954 films
Films scored by Franz Waxman
Films about Christianity
Films based on Canadian novels
Films directed by Victor Saville
Films set in ancient Rome
Films set in Jerusalem
Films set in Rome
Films set in the Roman Empire
Films shot in California
Religious epic films
Warner Bros. films
Films about the Holy Grail
Films produced by Victor Saville
Films with screenplays by Lesser Samuels
Depictions of Nero on film
CinemaScope films
Films about sculptors
1950s English-language films
American historical drama films
American epic films
1950s American films